Thalictrum sparsiflorum is a species of flowering plant in the buttercup family known by the common name fewflower meadow-rue. It is native to northwestern North America and parts of northeastern Asia. It grows in moist habitat, such as streambanks and forest understory. It is a perennial herb producing erect stems up to about a meter in maximum height. The leaves have compound blades divided into a few or many segments which are borne on long, slender petioles. The blades are usually finely hairy and glandular. The inflorescence is a leafy panicle of flowers. Unlike some other Thalictrum species which are dioecious, this species has bisexual flowers. Each has a calyx of five greenish sepals, and up to 20 light-colored dangling stamens tipped with large anthers. The flowers develop into compressed, beaked fruits.

Unlike some Thalictrum species, it is pollinated by insects rather than wind.

References

External links
Jepson Manual Treatment
Photo gallery

sparsiflorum
Flora of Subarctic America
Flora of Western Canada
Flora of Eastern Canada
Flora of the Northwestern United States
Flora of the Southwestern United States
Flora without expected TNC conservation status